Calivat Gadu is a Taiwanese politician. He currently serves as the Administrative Deputy Minister of the Council of Indigenous Peoples (CIP) of the Executive Yuan. He is of the Paiwan people.

He obtained his bachelor's degree in law from National Taiwan University, and continued his master's and doctoral degrees in ethnology from National Chengchi University.

He had been the Director-General of the Department of Planning and Department of Education and Culture of the CIP.

See also
 Taiwanese aborigines

References

Government ministers of Taiwan
Living people
Paiwan people
Year of birth missing (living people)
National Taiwan University alumni
National Chengchi University alumni